Josh Brolin (born 1968) is an American actor. Brolin has appeared in films such as The Goonies (1985), Mimic (1997), Hollow Man (2000), Coastlines (2002), Grindhouse (2007), No Country for Old Men (2007), American Gangster (2007), W. (2008), Milk (2008), True Grit (2010), Men in Black 3 (2012), Oldboy (2013), Inherent Vice (2014), Sicario (2015), Hail, Caesar! (2016),  Avengers: Infinity War (2018), Deadpool 2 (2018), Avengers: Endgame (2019), and Dune (2021).

Film

Television

Stage

References

Male actor filmographies
American filmographies